Bors (also referred to as Bors-de-Montmoreau, to distinguish it from Bors near Baignes-Sainte-Radegonde) is a commune in the Charente department in southwestern France.

Population

See also
Communes of the Charente department

References

Communes of Charente